Casalbuttano ed Uniti is a comune (municipality) in the Province of Cremona in the Italian region Lombardy, located about  southeast of Milan and about  northwest of Cremona.

Casalbuttano ed Uniti borders the following municipalities: Bordolano, Casalmorano, Castelverde, Castelvisconti, Corte de' Cortesi con Cignone, Olmeneta, Paderno Ponchielli, Pozzaglio ed Uniti.

Transportation 
Casalbuttano has a railway station on the Treviglio–Cremona line.

People
Ferruccio Ghinaglia
Ulisse Gualtieri

Religion

Churches

San Giorgio, Casalbuttano

References

External links
 Official website

Cities and towns in Lombardy